Beaver Creek (Lenape name - Amochkhanne, Amoch=beaver, khanne=creek) is a tributary of Tinicum Creek in Bridgeton, Nockamixon, and Tinicum Townships in Bucks County, Pennsylvania, in the United States. The creek is part of the Delaware River watershed.

Statistics
Beaver Creek was entered into the Geographic Names Information System on 2 August 1979 as identification number 1169002, its identification number in the PA Gazetteer of Streams is 3241.

Course
During its course it receives three tributaries from the left and three from the right. The average slope is 85.3 feet per mile (15.37 meters per kilometer).

Geology
Appalachian Highlands Division
Piedmont Province
Gettysburg-Newark Lowland Section
Diabase

Beaver Creek's course is located in a region of diabase rock which intruded into the local sedimentary layers of the Brunswick and Lockatong Formations during the Jurassic and the Triassic, then the remaining course flows over the Brunswick Formation. Diabase is a dark gray to black, fine grained and very dense, consisting of primarily labradorite and augite.

Crossings and Bridges

See also
List of rivers of the United States
List of rivers of Pennsylvania
List of Delaware River tributaries

References

Rivers of Bucks County, Pennsylvania
Rivers of Pennsylvania